JMC Airlines Limited (also known as JMC Air, JMC Airlines or simply JMC and stylised as jmc) was a UK charter airline formed by the merger of Caledonian Airways and Flying Colours Airlines, following the purchase of Thomas Cook & Son by the Carlson Leisure Group. JMC Air was named after the initials of the son of Thomas Cook, John Mason Cook. The airline was rebranded and remodeled in March 2003 to Thomas Cook Airlines UK. The airline operated flights from its 6 operating bases in the UK, offering seat-only bookings and bookings via Thomas Cook Tour Operations (Thomas Cook Package Holidays).

History 
It started operating under the name from March 2000. The main operating bases were London Gatwick Airport and Manchester Airport. Aircraft were also stationed at London Stansted Airport, Birmingham International Airport, Bristol Airport, Glasgow International Airport, Cardiff Airport and Newcastle Airport.

At the start of operations the fleet consisted of Boeing 757-200, Airbus A320, Airbus A330-200 and McDonnell Douglas DC-10 aircraft. Subsequently, the airline became the first UK operator of the stretched Boeing 757-300. Thomas Cook was sold to C&N Touristic of Germany in 2000. On 31 March 2003 Thomas Cook rebranded the airline along with its other airlines as Thomas Cook Airlines.

Fleet
JMC rebranded as Thomas Cook Airlines in 2003. JMC operated the following aircraft in March 2003 before ceasing of operations:

The only other aircraft operated were two McDonnell Douglas DC-10-30s, which were put out of service in 2001.

JMC were the first UK operator to use the Boeing 757-300.

Destinations
See: Thomas Cook Airlines destinations

See also
 List of defunct airlines of the United Kingdom

References

Defunct airlines of the United Kingdom
Airlines established in 2000
Airlines disestablished in 2003